Ten-eleven translocation methylcytosine dioxygenase 1 (TET1) is a member of the TET family of enzymes, in humans it is encoded by the TET1 gene. Its function, regulation, and utilizable pathways remain a matter of current research while it seems to be involved in DNA demethylation and therefore gene regulation.

Discovery 

TET1 was first discovered in a 61-year-old patient with a rare variation of t(10;11)(q22;q23) acute myeloid leukemia (AML) as a zinc-finger binding protein (specifically on the CXXC domain) that fuses to the gene MLL. Another study confirmed that this protein was a translocation partner of MLL in an 8-year-old patient with  t(10;11)(q22;q23) AML and named the protein Ten-Eleven Translocation 1.

Function 

TET1 catalyzes the conversion of the modified DNA base 5-methylcytosine (5-mC) to 5-hydroxymethylcytosine (5-hmC).

TET1 produces 5-hmC by oxidation of 5-mC in an iron and alpha-ketoglutarate dependent manner. The conversion of 5-mC to 5-hmC has been proposed as the initial step of active DNA demethylation in mammals. Additionally, downgrading TET1 has decreased levels of 5-formylcytosine (5-fC)  and 5-carboxylcytosine (5-caC) in both cell cultures and mice.

A site with a 5-hmC base already has increased transcriptional activity, a state termed "functional demethylation". This state is common in post-mitotic neurons.

Applications 

TET1 appears to facilitate nuclear reprogramming of somatic cells to iPS cells.

The enzyme is also utilized as part of TET-Assisted Bisulfite Sequencing (TAB-seq) to quantify levels of hydroxymethylation in the genome and to distinguish 5-hydroxymethylcytosine (5hmc) from 5-methylcytosine (5mc) at single base resolution. The technique was developed by Chuan He and rectifies the inability of traditional bisulfite sequencing to decipher between the two modified bases. In this technique, TET1 is responsible for the oxidation of 5mc allowing it to be read as thymine following treatment with bisulfite. This is not the case for 5hmc as it is glucosylated in the initial step inhibiting its oxidation by TET1.

Clinical significance 

Patients with schizophrenia or bipolar disorder have shown increased levels of TET1 mRNA and protein expression in the inferior parietal lobule, indicating these diseases may be caused by mistakes in gene expression regulation.

Colon, breast, prostate and liver tumors have significantly reduced levels of TET1 compared to the healthy colon cells and normal epithelial colon cells with downgraded TET1 levels have greater levels of proliferation. Additionally, increasing TET1 expression levels in colon cancer cells decreased cell proliferation in both cell cultures and mice through demethylation of promoters of the WNT signaling pathway.

Breast cancer cell lines with silenced TET1 expression have increased rates of invasion and breast cancers that spread to the lymph nodes are characterized by lower TET1 levels. TET1 levels could be used to detect breast cancer metastasis. A histone deacetylase inhibitor Trichostatin A increased levels of TET1 in breast cancer tissues but was a less effective tumor suppressor in patients with low TET1 expression. Breast cancer patients with high TET1 levels had significantly higher survival probabilities than patients with low TET1 levels.

Degradation of TET1 in hypoxia-induced EMT lung cancer cells led to reduced metastasis rates and cells. Healthy cells transitioning to cancer cells have decreased levels of TET1 but decreasing TET1 expression does not lead to malignancy. Cancer cells using the KRAS pathway had decreased invasive potential after reintroducing TET1, likewise downgrading KRAS increased TET1 levels.

References

Further reading 

 
 
 
 
 
 
 
 
 

EC 1.14.11